Shale is a web application framework maintained by the Apache Software Foundation. It is fundamentally based on JavaServer Faces. As of May 2009 Apache Shale has been retired and moved to the Apache Attic.

See also

 Apache Struts

References

External links
 Shale project homepage
 JSF Central Interviews Craig McClanahan about Shale
 Apache Shale Web framework project retired

Shale
Jakarta Server Faces
Web frameworks